Amalia von Hatzfeld (1560 – 23 September 1628), was a Swedish countess. She was the governor of Raseborg in 1600–1607.

Amalia von Hatzfeld was born to Vilhelm von Hatzfeld and Sibylla von Rodenhausen. Prior to her marriage, she served as maid of honor to Princess Maria. In 1592, she married count Mauritz Stensson Leijonhufvud. She became the mother of Ebba Mauritzdotter Leijonhufvud.
After the death of her spouse in 1600, the crown returned the county of Raseborg in Finland, which had been confiscated from her spouse, to her. She managed it as governor until 1607, when she sold it to the nephew of her late spouse, Sten.

References

 Svenskt biografiskt handlexikon
 http://www.adelsvapen.com/genealogi/Lewenhaupt_nr_2
 Gustaf Elgenstierna, Den introducerade svenska adelns ättartavlor. 1925-36.

1560 births
17th-century Finnish people
1628 deaths
Swedish countesses
Swedish ladies-in-waiting
17th-century women rulers